The 2013 United States Olympic Curling Trials was held from November 10 to 17, 2013 at the Scheels Arena in Fargo, North Dakota. The trials were held to determine the women's team that will represent the United States at the curling tournament at the 2014 Winter Olympics and the men's team that will represent the United States at the qualification event for the 2014 Winter Olympics curling tournament.

Road to the Trials
Teams on the men's and women's sides will qualify to the Olympic Trials in one of two ways. Teams will be able to qualify directly to the Trials by finishing in either first or second place at the 2012 and 2013 National Curling Championships, or they will qualify indirectly through selection by the United States Curling Association's High Performance Program (HPP) Selection Committee. The HPP Selection Committee's selections will be based on prior performance at World and National Championships, Order of Merit rankings, and performance in World Curling Tour events in the three years preceding the Trials (2011–2013).

For the men's tournament, a maximum of five teams will compete for the right to represent the United States at the qualification event for the Winter Olympics. The first and second placed teams from the 2012 National Championships and from the 2013 National Championships will qualify directly for the Trials. In the event that both of the directly qualifying teams from the 2013 National Championships already qualified via the 2012 National Championships, giving a total of two directly qualified teams, the HPP Selection Committee will select two additional teams to compete in the Trials, making a total of four teams. In the event that one of the directly qualifying teams from the 2013 National Championships already qualified via the 2012 National Championships, giving a total of three directly qualified teams, the selection committee will select one additional team to compete in the Trials, making a total of four teams. However, if there are two or more American teams that have placed within the top twenty of the Order of Merit, and if at least one of those two teams has not earned a qualification spot in the Trials, the selection committee will choose two additional teams, bringing the total to five teams. If none of the aforementioned scenarios applies, which would imply a total of four directly qualifying teams, the selection committee will choose one additional team to compete in the Trials, bringing the total to five teams.

For the women's tournament, a total of four teams will compete for the right to represent the United States at the Winter Olympics. The first and second placed teams from the 2012 National Championships will qualify directly for the Trials. The first placed team from the 2013 National Championships will likewise qualify directly for the Trials. In the event that the first placed team from the 2013 National Championships has already qualified for the Trials via the 2012 National Championships, the second placed team will qualify for the Trials. In the event that the second place team from the 2013 National Championships has also already qualified for the Trials via the 2012 National Championships, the selection committee will select two additional teams to compete in the Trials. Otherwise, if there is a directly qualifying team from the 2013 National Championships, the selection committee will select one additional team to compete in the Trials.

Men

Teams
The teams are listed as follows:

Round Robin Standings
Final Round Robin Standings

Round Robin Results
All draw times are listed in Central Standard Time (UTC−6).

Draw 1
Sunday, November 10, 1:00 pm

Draw 2
Sunday, November 10, 7:00 pm

Draw 3
Monday, November 11, 12:00 pm

Draw 4
Monday, November 11, 7:00 pm

Draw 5
Tuesday, November 12, 12:00 pm

Draw 6
Tuesday, November 12, 7:00 pm

Draw 7
Wednesday, November 13, 12:00 pm

Draw 8
Wednesday, November 13, 7:00 pm

Draw 9
Thursday, November 14, 9:00 am

Draw 10
Thursday, November 14, 3:30 pm

Final
The final round will be between the top two teams at the end of the round robin. The teams will play a best-of-three series.

Game 1
Friday, November 15, 2:30 pm

Game 2
Saturday, November 16, 2:30pm

Game 3
Sunday, November 17, 11:00 am

Women

Teams
The teams are listed as follows:

Round Robin Standings
Final Round Robin Standings

Round Robin Results
All draw times are listed in Central Standard Time (UTC−6).

Draw 1
Monday, November 11, 7:00 pm

Draw 2
Tuesday, November 12, 12:00 pm

Draw 3
Tuesday, November 12, 7:00 pm

Draw 4
Wednesday, November 13, 12:00 pm

Draw 5
Wednesday, November 13, 7:00 pm

Draw 6
Thursday, November 14, 9:00 am

Final
The final round was between the top two teams at the end of the round robin. The teams played a best-of-three series.

Game 1
Friday, November 15, 2:30 pm

Game 2
Saturday, November 16, 7:00 pm

References

External links

Website at USA Curling

United States Olympic Curling Trials
United States Olympic Curling Trials
Olympic Curling Trials
Trials
Qualification events for the 2014 Winter Olympics
United States Olympic Curling Trials
Curling competitions in North Dakota
Sports in Fargo, North Dakota